Ireland competed at the 2012 Summer Olympics in London, United Kingdom, from July 27 to August 12, 2012. This was the nation's twentieth appearance at the Summer Olympics.

The Olympic Council of Ireland sent a total of 66 athletes to the Games, 36 men and 30 women, to compete in 14 sports. The International Olympic Committee allowed athletes from Northern Ireland the option to compete at the Olympic Games for either Great Britain or Ireland. Medallists Paddy Barnes and Michael Conlan were both born in Belfast, Northern Ireland and chose to compete for Team Ireland. Ireland had only a single competitor in the sprint canoeing, track cycling, equestrian dressage, judo, rowing and shooting events.

This was Ireland's most successful Olympics, winning a total of 6 medals (1 gold, 1 silver and 4 bronze) in three sports: boxing, athletics and equestrian show jumping. Boxer Katie Taylor, who was Ireland's flag bearer at the opening ceremony, won Ireland's first Olympic gold medal in 16 years. Light flyweight boxer Paddy Barnes defended his bronze medal from Beijing, becoming the second Irish athlete in 80 years to win medals at two consecutive Olympics. For the first time since 1980, Ireland also won an Olympic medal in more than a single sport.

Medallists

| width="78%" align="left" valign="top" |

| width="22%" align="left" valign="top" |

International media coverage
Katie Taylor's Olympic boxing success led to inaccurate coverage in the international media. While previewing her semi-final bout, The Daily Telegraph, a conservative English newspaper, incorrectly referred to Taylor as "British", prompting fierce criticism from other media outlets, and an apology from the Telegraph. Fairfax Media of Australia also issued an apology, after articles published in The Age, Brisbane Times and The Sydney Morning Herald were widely condemned as "lazy stereotyping" of the Irish. Irish Ambassador to Australia Noel White issued a formal complaint about the article's reliance on Guinness, whiskey and potatoes to make a story. USA Today was criticised after its article said: "Back home on the emerald-green isle, pints of Guinness flowed freely, perhaps enough to replenish the Irish Sea. The "punters" inside betting parlors [sic] wagered pounds [sic] as if they were bits of candy. It is not hyperbole to suggest that, when Taylor entered the ring, the weight of a prideful, scuffling nation rested on her muscular shoulders." Also, Australian commentator Russell Barwick provoked "fury" while on ESPN, comparing Team Ireland's independence from Team GB to Tasmanian athletes not performing for Australia.

Athletics

The Irish team selection caused a number of controversies. In the women's marathon Linda Byrne, Ava Hutchinson and Caitriona Jennings were selected while Maria McCambridge, who had also run the 'A' qualifying standard missed out on selection, as only three athletes from a nation may compete in the event. Additionally the deadline for qualification for the marathon had been changed to allow Barbara Sanchez, who holds dual Irish and French citizenship, a chance to qualify. The team for the women's 4 × 400 metres relay was changed after Joanna Mills won an appeal of her exclusion on the grounds of having a faster time than Catriona Cuddihy who had initially been selected.

Irish athletes achieved qualifying standards in the following athletics events (up to a maximum of 3 athletes in each event at the 'A' Standard, and 1 at the 'B' Standard):

Men
Track & road events

Women
Track & road events

Field events

Badminton

Ireland qualified two badminton players for the Games. Scott Evans competed in the men's singles and Chloe Magee in the women's singles.; each made their second appearance at an Olympic Games.

Boxing

Ireland qualified boxers for the following events.

Men

Women

Canoeing

Slalom
Ireland qualified boats for the following events.

Sprint
Ireland qualified boats for the following events.

Qualification Legend: FA = Qualify to final (medal); FB = Qualify to final B (non-medal)

Cycling

Road

Track
Omnium

Equestrian

By rankings Ireland qualified one athlete in dressage, an eventing team and two athletes in jumping.

Dressage

Eventing

Show jumping

Gymnastics

Ireland qualified a single gymnast for London; Kieran Behan, just the second Irish gymnast in history to qualify for the Olympics, competed in the artistic gymnastics discipline.

Artistic
Men

Judo

Modern pentathlon

Ireland qualified 2 athletes.

Rowing

Ireland qualified the following boats.

Women

Qualification Legend: FA=Final A (medal); FB=Final B (non-medal); FC=Final C (non-medal); FD=Final D (non-medal); FE=Final E (non-medal); FF=Final F (non-medal); SA/B=Semifinals A/B; SC/D=Semifinals C/D; SE/F=Semifinals E/F; QF=Quarterfinals; R=Repechage

Sailing

Ireland qualified 1 boat for each of the following events.

Men

Women

Open

M = Medal race; EL = Eliminated – did not advance into the medal race;

Shooting

Men

Swimming

Irish swimmers achieved qualifying standards in the following events (up to a maximum of 2 swimmers in each event at the Olympic Qualifying Time (OQT), and 1 at the Olympic Selection Time (OST)):

Men

Qualifiers for the latter rounds (Q) of all events were decided on a time only basis, therefore positions shown are overall results versus competitors in all heats.

Women

Qualifiers for the latter rounds (Q) of all events were decided on a time only basis, therefore positions shown are overall results versus competitors in all heats.

Triathlon

Ireland qualified the following athletes.

See also
Ireland at the 2012 Winter Youth Olympics

References

Nations at the 2012 Summer Olympics
2012
2012 in Irish sport